Iowa Highway 92 (Iowa 92) is a state highway that runs from east to west across the state of Iowa. It begins at the Missouri River in Council Bluffs, where it is a continuation of Nebraska Highway 92. It stretches across the state and serves to roughly demarcate the southern one-third of Iowa. It ends at the Mississippi River in Muscatine where it continues into Illinois as Illinois Route 92. In 1939, Iowa 92 replaced the original Iowa 2 in its entirety.

Route description
Iowa 92 begins on the South Omaha Bridge above the Missouri River with U.S. Highway 275 (US 275) between Omaha, Nebraska, and Council Bluffs.  It is a continuation of Nebraska Highway 92, which stretches across Nebraska and is itself a continuation of Wyoming Highway 92.  Through Council Bluffs, the highways pass through the southern part of the city but just to the north of Lake Manawa.  At an interchange with Interstate 29 (I-29), US 275 splits away from Iowa 92 and joins the Interstate Highway.  The road continues east through Pottawattamie County and into the communities of Treynor and Carson.  Just east of Carson lies a two-quadrant interchange with US 59.   later, the highway crosses the East Nishnabotna River before it enters Griswold.  There, it meets Iowa 48.  The highway travels further east until it reaches an intersection with US 71 at Lyman.  Iowa 92 turns north onto US 71 and the two highways are overlapped for  when Iowa 92 returns to its easterly course.

The highway heads due east for  where it meets Iowa 148 near Massena and passes to the north of Bridgewater.  After the long straightaway, the highway turns to the northeast towards Fontanelle and then curves to the east-northeast to Greenfield and an intersection with Iowa 25.  East of Greenfield, the highway follows a stair-step pattern, an easterly straightaway followed by a short curve to the north and then back to the east, for nearly  until it reaches US 169 on the western outskirts of Winterset.  Iowa 92 turns north onto US 169 and the two highways form a northwestern bypass of Winterset.  At John Wayne Drive, named after the actor who was born in Winterset, US 169 turns to the north toward Adel and Iowa 92 continues to the east.  It passes the town of Patterson and goes through Bevington.  Just east of the latter town, is an interchange with I-35.  The highway travels to Martensdale, where it meets Iowa 28 and crosses the Middle River.  Almost  later, the highway enters the southern part of Indianola and intersects US 65 / US 69.

Iowa 92 exits Indianola and continues east.  It goes through the small towns of Ackworth and Sandyville.  Near, Pleasantville, it widens to a four-lane divided highway right before it intersects Iowa 5, which joins from the north.  The two highways head to the southwest toward Knoxville.  On the western edge of the city, a directional interchange marks the beginning of Iowa 92's lone business route as the mainline highway curves to the south.  A half-diamond interchange shortly thereafter completes the traffic movements to and from the business route.  Near Knoxville Municipal Airport lies an interchange with Iowa 14 and in the southeastern part of Knoxville, Iowa 5 exits the four-lane highway.  Iowa 92 Business also ends at this interchange.  About  later, the highway narrows to two lanes.  For the next , the highway does not pass through any community.  It crosses the Des Moines River near the midpoint of this rural stretch.  As it approaches Oskaloosa, the highway turns to the northeast and intersects Iowa 163 at a diamond interchange.  Through Oskaloosa, Iowa 92 follows A Avenue, the main east–west street; it goes through the downtown area where it intersects US 63 at Market Street.  East of downtown, near the neighboring community of University Park, it meets Iowa 23, which heads south to Ottumwa.  Continuing east, the highway crosses the north and south branches of the Skunk River before it intersects Iowa 21 northwest of Delta.

The roadway follows a straight line east through Sigourney, where it is briefly overlapped by Iowa 149, and West Chester.  A few miles north of Washington, it is met by Iowa 1 from Iowa City to the north.  The two highways travel south into the western side of Washington.  Iowa 1 exits to the south as the highway curves to the east into the town.  It skirts Washington's downtown area to the south, then to the east as it jogs north for two blocks before heading east once again.  It passes through Ainsworth shortly before reaching the Avenue of the Saints highway.  East of the Avenue of the Saints, the path of Iowa 92 is shaped by the adjacent railroad tracks owned by Canadian Pacific.  At Columbus Junction, the highway takes an overpass above the downtown area and descends into the Iowa River valley.  Less than a mile north of the highway is the confluence of the Iowa and Cedar rivers.  It then passes just to the south of Fredonia and continues east to an interchange with US 61 at Grandview.

Iowa 92 turns north to follow US 61 for most of its remaining journey in Iowa.  The highways turn to the northeast to descend onto Muscatine Island, a sandy plain known for growing conditions ideal for melons, particularly muskmelons.  On the southwestern edge of Muscatine, US 61 and Iowa 92 turn off of the highway onto a bypass of city.  US 61 Business continues northeasterly from the intersection.  The bypass forms a near-180 degree squared arc around the city.  Near the halfway mark of the road around Muscatine, the two highways are joined by Iowa 22.  The highway then turns to the east, where it roughly marks the northern city limit.  The bypass ends at an intersection with Iowa 38 and the other end of US 61 Business.  There, both Iowa 22 splits away from US 61 with Iowa 22 to follow Iowa 38 southward to the city's riverfront.  At Washington Street, Iowa 22 turns east toward Buffalo and Davenport.  Iowa 92, US 61 Business, and Iowa 38 head south and then southwest for a few more blocks.  At the foot of the Norbert F. Beckey Bridge, where Iowa 92 turns east towards Illinois, Iowa 38 ends and US 61 Business continues south into downtown Muscatine.  Iowa 92 crosses the Mississippi River on the Beckey Bridge and continues in Illinois as Illinois Route 92.

History

Iowa Highway 92 was designated on February 1, 1939, replacing the former Iowa Highway 2 in its entirety.  Iowa 92's designation created a continuous Highway 92 from North Platte, Nebraska to La Moille, Illinois.

Major intersections

Business route

Iowa Highway 92 Business serves Knoxville, which follows the pre-freeway alignment of Iowa 92 and Iowa 5.

Major intersections

References

External links

 End of Iowa 92 at Iowa Highway Ends

092
Council Bluffs, Iowa
Transportation in Pottawattamie County, Iowa
Transportation in Cass County, Iowa
Transportation in Adair County, Iowa
Transportation in Madison County, Iowa
Transportation in Warren County, Iowa
Transportation in Marion County, Iowa
Transportation in Mahaska County, Iowa
Transportation in Muscatine County, Iowa